Makunudhoo as a place name may refer to:
 Makunudhoo (Haa Dhaalu Atoll) (Republic of Maldives)
 Makunudhoo (Kaafu Atoll) (Republic of Maldives)